Prays autocasis is a moth of the  family Praydidae. It is found in Australia.

References

External links
Australian Faunal Directory

Plutellidae
Moths described in 1907